The Time Traveller's Guide to Medieval England: A Handbook for Visitors to the Fourteenth Century is a handbook about Late Medieval England by British historian Ian Mortimer. It was first published on 2 October 2008 by The Bodley Head, and a later edition with more pages was released on 29 February 2012. The volume debunks and explains various myths about the period.

The book is confined to the 14th century in England, with passing references to the Continent. Mortimer goes into details about food, clothing, building materials, the layout of houses, but also covers things like laws, customs, travel, entertainment. It is ground-breaking in historical literature in that it is written entirely in the present tense.

Illustrations 
All the illustrations in the volume were provided by British Library.

Reception 
The book is one of the best-selling social history titles of the twenty-first century, it reached number six on the Sunday Times paperback non-fiction bestseller list at Christmas 2009. The book has sold more than 250,000 paperback copies in the UK, 100,000 copies in the USA, and is published in several other languages.

On first publication it was widely praised. Sue Arnold, writing in The Guardian, commented "After The Canterbury Tales this has to be the most entertaining book ever written about the Middle Ages." The historian Alison Weir stated,"It`s an incredible tour de force, a vivid and page-turning evocation of an age that is long-gone yet has been brought to life again in vibrant and robust fashion thanks to Ian Mortimer`s impeccable scholarship and pacy writing." Professor Steohen Howe, writing in The Independent, remarked that it was "Perhaps the most enjoyable history book I've read all year."

A review written by Kathryn Hughes for The Guardian praised the book's different approach and abundance of trivia, adding that "It is Monty Python and the Holy Grail with footnotes and, my goodness, it is fun... The result of this careful blend of scholarship and fancy is a jaunty journey through the 14th century, one that wriggles with the stuff of everyday life... [A] deft summary of life in the high medieval period." The Washington Post'''s short review by Aaron Leitko vaunted the book as "Fodor's-style framework" and a travel book that gets into "heart of a different time zone".

Tom Holland, writing for The Daily Telegraph, was a lone critical voice. He described the volume as an "old-fashioned study". Holland also proposed that Mortimer felt embarrassed to write a book about what was "familiar to a reader in the 19th century". Mortimer addressed Holland's criticism by implying that Holland had failed to understand the book, going as far as to call Holland's review "bizarre". In his reply, Mortimer assumed that Holland wanted the book to be "semi-fictionalised" and explained that such an approach would trivialise his work, as the volume is intended to be useful to students, but also hoped to stand the "test of time".

Sequels
The book has spawned several sequels such as:

 The Time Traveller's Guide to Elizabethan England: a Handbook for Visitors to the Sixteenth Century was published in 2012 by Viking Press
 The Time Traveller's Guide to Restoration Britain: Life in the Age of Samuel Pepys, Isaac Newton and The Great Fire of London by The Bodley Head in 2017
 The Time Traveller's Guide to Regency Britain'' was published in 2020 by Random House

Popular culture
Various big YouTube historians—such as Raffaello Urbani ("Metatron") and Skallagrim Nilsson—have produced videos about the book and endorsed it.

References

External links
The Time Traveler's Guide to Medieval England at Mortimer's website

14th century in England
2008 non-fiction books
21st-century history books
Handbooks and manuals
History books about the Middle Ages